Daggett (also Daggett's Mill, Daggetts Mill) is an unincorporated community in Jackson Township, Tioga County, Pennsylvania, United States.

History
The community was founded in 1827 and named for the pioneer settler Seth Daggett, as indicated by the Keystone Marker inlaid in cement wall.

Notable person

Philip Petty (1840-1917), recipient of the Medal of Honor, lived in Daggett.

Notes

Unincorporated communities in Tioga County, Pennsylvania
Unincorporated communities in Pennsylvania